Trifolium gymnocarpon is a species of clover known by the common name hollyleaf clover.

It is native to the western United States, from California to New Mexico, and Oregon to Montana. It can be found in many types of habitat, including sagebrush scrub.

Description
Trifolium gymnocarpon  is a small perennial herb with stems spreading along the ground to form a flat mat or clump. The leaves are each made up of 3 to 5 thick, hairy leaflets with serrated edges. The inflorescence is an umbel of flowers spreading out or flexing downward. The flower is roughly a centimeter long and dull pink or brownish in color.

Subspecies
Trifolium gymnocarpon ssp. plummerae — Plummer's clover, an Endangered species within California, but the subspecies is apparently secure, considering populations outside California.

References

External links
Calflora Database: Trifolium gymnocarpon (Hollyleaf clover)
Jepson Manual eFlora (TJM2) treatment of  Trifolium gymnocarpon ssp. plummerae
Southwest Colorado Wildflowers
UC CalPhotos gallery: Trifolium gymnocarpon ssp. plummerae

gymnocarpon
Flora of the Northwestern United States
Flora of the Southwestern United States
Flora of California
Flora of New Mexico
Flora of the Great Basin
Flora without expected TNC conservation status